Ghaziabad Junction railway station (station code:- GZB) is on the Kanpur–Delhi section of Howrah–Delhi main line, Howrah–Gaya–Delhi line and New Delhi–Bareilly–Lucknow line. It is located in Ghaziabad district in the Indian state of Uttar Pradesh. It serves Ghaziabad.

History

Through trains started running on the East Indian Railway Company's Howrah–Delhi line in 1866.

The railway line between Meerut and Delhi was constructed in 1864.

The Scinde, Punjab & Delhi Railway completed the  Amritsar–Ambala–Saharanpur–Ghaziabad line in 1870 connecting Multan (now in Pakistan) with Delhi.

The Ghaziabad–Moradabad link was established by Oudh and Rohilkhand Railway in 1900.

Electrification

The Tundla–Aligarh–Ghaziabad sector was electrified in 1975–76, and the Ghaziabad–Nizamuddin–New Delhi–Delhi sector in 1976–77,

The  Ghaziabad–Moradabad line was completely electrified in January 2016. The Ghaziabad–Meerut–Muzaffarnagar–Saharanpur–Roorkee–Haridwar line is also open to electric trains with effect from March 2016.

Local electric trains
Local electric trains are available regularly from Ghaziabad for stations in the National Capital Region. Distance:  (26 km),  (20 km),  (23 km),  (13 km).

List of local trains
Local trains which run on a regular interval are EMUs, MEMUs, Passengers. Local trains start in the early morning and run till midnight.

Amenities
Amenities for passengers at Ghaziabad include: waiting rooms, escalators, water coolers, automated teller machines, pure vegetarian restaurants, refreshment rooms, book stall, computerized reservation office, and telephone booths.

Electric Loco Shed
The Ghaziabad electric locomotive shed serves the Delhi area. It houses and maintains India's fastest locomotives which are mostly used in the Rajdhani, the Shatabdi and the Duronto Expresses. It stores 3 phase locomotives like WAP-5 & WAP-7 locomotives.

It is currently holds 100+ WAP-5 locomotives and 150+ WAP-7 locomotives.

Gallery

References

External links

 

Railway junction stations in Uttar Pradesh
Railway stations in Ghaziabad district, India
Delhi railway division
Transport in Ghaziabad, Uttar Pradesh
Railway stations opened in 1865
Buildings and structures in Ghaziabad, Uttar Pradesh